Undecaprenyl-phosphate 4-deoxy-4-formamido-L-arabinose transferase (undecaprenyl-phosphate Ara4FN transferase, Ara4FN transferase, polymyxin resistance protein PmrF) is an enzyme with systematic name . This enzyme catalyses the following chemical reaction

   UDP + 

The enzyme shows no activity with UDP-4-amino-4-deoxy-beta-L-arabinose.

References

External links 
 

EC 2.7.8